Andrew Albicy (born 21 March 1990) is a French professional basketball player for Herbalife Gran Canaria of the Spanish Liga ACB, and the France national team.

Club career

Albicy has played with the Paris-Levallois Basket's youth team as a junior.  He made a few appearances for the club's senior team between 2006 and 2009, before playing his first full season for the team in the 2009–10 season.  Albicy averaged 4.5 points and 3.6 assists per game for the team while backing up starting guard Jimmal Ball.

Albicy initially declared as an early-entry candidate for the 2010 NBA draft before withdrawing his name from consideration.

On 31 July 2014 he signed a two-year deal with BCM Gravelines.

After finishing his contract at Gravelines, in June 2016 Albicy signed for MoraBanc Andorra. This will be his first experience out of France. On 24 August 2017 he signed a two-year contract extension with Andorra. In the 2018–19 season, Albicy reached the semi-finals of the EuroCup with Andorra.

On June 17, 2019, Albicy signed a contract with Zenit Saint Petersburg of the VTB United League. He parted ways with the team on July 20, 2020. Albicy averaged 6.6 points and 4.4 assists per game. On July 25, 2020, he signed with Herbalife Gran Canaria of the Spanish Liga ACB.

International career
Albicy played with the French national basketball team at each level of junior basketball.  He appeared for the team at the 2006 FIBA Europe Under-16 Championship, U18 European Championship Men 2008 Division A, FIBA Under-19 World Championship 2009, and 2010 FIBA Europe Under-20 Championship.  He was named tournament MVP for the gold-medal winning French team at the 2010 Under-20 tournament.

He was called to the senior French team for the first time at the 2010 FIBA World Championship to replace fellow point guard Rodrigue Beaubois.  At only twenty years of age, he was the youngest member of the French team at the tournament.

References

External links
 
 Andrew Albicy at eurobasket.com
 Andrew Albicy at euroleague.net

1990 births
Living people
2010 FIBA World Championship players
2019 FIBA Basketball World Cup players
Basketball players at the 2020 Summer Olympics
BC Andorra players
Expatriate basketball people in Andorra
BCM Gravelines players
BC Zenit Saint Petersburg players
Black French sportspeople
CB Gran Canaria players
French expatriate basketball people in Russia
French expatriate basketball people in Spain
French men's basketball players
Liga ACB players
Medalists at the 2020 Summer Olympics
Metropolitans 92 players
Olympic basketball players of France
Olympic medalists in basketball
Olympic silver medalists for France
People from Sèvres
Point guards
Sportspeople from Hauts-de-Seine